Peter Schaefer (born July 12, 1977) is a Canadian former professional ice hockey player who played in the National Hockey League (NHL) for the Ottawa Senators, Boston Bruins and Vancouver Canucks. During his playing career, he was best known as a two-way forward. After his playing career, Schaefer most recently served as head coach, general manager and president of the Surrey Eagles of the British Columbia Hockey League (BCHL).

Playing career 
Schaefer played major junior in the Western Hockey League (WHL) with the Brandon Wheat Kings. He recorded 59 points in his rookie season with Brandon and was subsequently drafted by the Vancouver Canucks 66th overall in the 1995 NHL Entry Draft. The following season, in 1995–96, he improved to 108 points, ninth overall in the league, then added 23 points in the playoffs, leading Brandon to a President's Cup championship and 1996 Memorial Cup appearance.

Schaefer continued to improve in the WHL the following season, putting up a junior career-high 123 points, fourth overall in league scoring. On March 14, 1997, he tied a WHL record for most shorthanded goals in a game with 3 in an 8–1 win against the Medicine Hat Tigers. Schaefer earned the Four Broncos Memorial Trophy as league MVP as well as the WHL Plus-Minus Award with a league-high +57 rating in his final WHL season.

Schaefer assisted Team Canada in winning the gold medal at the IIHF U20 World Junior Championships in Geneva, Switzerland in 1997. 

Graduating from major junior, Schaefer spent several seasons in the American Hockey League (AHL) with the Canucks' minor league affiliate, the Syracuse Crunch. He cracked the Canucks' lineup in 1998–99, scoring 8 points in 25 games. He improved to 31, then 36 points in the following two seasons before playing overseas for TPS of the SM-liiga in 2001–02.

Before the start of the 2002–03 season, Schaefer was traded to the Ottawa Senators in exchange for defenceman Sami Salo. In 2005–06, he recorded a career-high 20 goals, 30 assists and 50 points with the Senators. The following season, he helped the Senators to the 2007 Stanley Cup Finals, but lost to the Anaheim Ducks in five games.

In the off-season, on July 17, 2007, he was traded to the Boston Bruins in exchange for Shean Donovan. Ottawa general manager Bryan Murray later revealed that Schaefer had requested a trade on a couple of occasions during the season and that Schaefer was under-performing.

In Schaefer's first season with the Bruins, in 2007–08, his points total dipped to 26 points, his lowest output since 2002–03. He began the season on the top line with Marc Savard, but was quickly demoted to the fourth line and was a healthy scratch on several occasions after returning from leg and foot injuries. The following season, he failed to make the team's roster out of training camp. He was placed on waivers and once he cleared, was assigned to the Providence Bruins, Boston's AHL affiliate. After the 2008–09 season, the final year remaining on Schaefer's contract was bought out by the Bruins on June 30, 2009.

Schaefer did not play in the 2009–10 season, training extensively to make an NHL comeback while living in West Vancouver. After being invited to the Vancouver Canucks' 2010 training camp on a tryout basis, he was signed to a one-year, two-way, contract worth $600,000 on October 7, 2010. However, after 16 games, he was put on waivers by Vancouver in November 2010. Unwilling to play in the minors, the club put him on waivers a second time in order to release him. Schaefer's agent said both sides were amicable in the departure, agreeing to simply terminate the contract. Becoming an unrestricted free agent, he signed overseas with German team ERC Ingolstadt of the Deutsche Eishockey Liga (DEL) in January 2011.

After his playing career ended, Schaefer became an assistant coach of the Surrey Eagles of the British Columbia Hockey League (BCHL) for the 2012–13 season. The following season, he was named head coach, general manager and president of the team.

Family 
Schaefer's younger brother, Nolan Schaefer, was a goaltender who played for the San Jose Sharks for part of the 2005–06 season. He also played many seasons in the AHL and Europe. His younger sister Falin played volleyball for the Canadian national team.

Awards and achievements 
 Named to the CHL First All-Star Team in 1996.
 Named to the WHL East First All-Star Team in 1996.
 Won the President's Cup (WHL champions) with the Brandon Wheat Kings in 1996.
 Named to the CHL First All-Star Team in 1997.
 Named to the WHL East First All-Star Team in 1997.
 Awarded the Four Broncos Memorial Trophy (WHL MVP) in 1997.
 Awarded the WHL Plus-Minus Award in 1997.

Records 
 WHL record for most shorthanded goals in one game – 3 (on March 14, 1997, against the Medicine Hat Tigers; tied with Kalvin Knibbs, Glen Goodall, Brett McLean, and Matt Calvert)

Career statistics

Regular season and playoffs

International

References

External links 
 

1977 births
Boston Bruins players
Brandon Wheat Kings players
Canadian expatriate ice hockey players in Finland
Canadian expatriate ice hockey players in Germany
Canadian ice hockey left wingers
Canadian people of German descent
ERC Ingolstadt players
HC TPS players
Ice hockey people from Saskatchewan
Living people
Ottawa Senators players
Providence Bruins players
Syracuse Crunch players
Vancouver Canucks draft picks
Vancouver Canucks players